Cook's petrel (Pterodroma cookii) or the blue-footed petrel, is a Procellariform seabird. It is a member of the gadfly petrels and part of the subgroup known as Cookilaria petrels, which includes the very similar Stejneger's petrel.

Morphology

Its colouration is typical of gadfly petrels: pale grey upperparts with a dark grey "M" on the wings and white underparts.

The bill is long and black with tubular nostrils on both sides. As in all members of the order Procellariiformes, this nostril configuration enables an exceptionally acute sense of smell, which the birds use to locate food and nest sites in the dark.

Diet 
Cook's petrel feeds mostly on fish and squid, with some crustaceans taken. The species is highly pelagic except when nesting.

Habitat

Cook's petrel breeds only in New Zealand on three small islands: Little Barrier Island, Great Barrier Island, and Codfish Island. The breeding season is the southern summer, October–May. It nests in burrows and rock crevices, preferring sites on thickly forested ridges. The species was formerly more numerous; the current population estimate is 1,258,000 and declining. It is classified as vulnerable because it breeds on only three small islands. While Little Barrier Island's population remains stable, the other two populations are decreasing. On Great Barrier Island, introduced pigs, dogs, rats and cats attack nests and burrows, as do native weka (a flightless rail), preying on eggs and nestlings and reducing the population from an estimated 20,000 to 100.

Cook's petrel migrates to the Pacific Ocean from New Zealand when it is not breeding. It has sometimes been seen off the west coast of the United States and off the west coast of tropical South America.

References

External links

 
 
 
 
 
 

Cook's petrel
Birds of New Zealand
Birds of the Cook Islands
Cook's petrel
Cook's petrel